Jeison Fabián Murillo Cerón (born 27 May 1992) is a Colombian professional footballer who plays as a central defender for Italian club U.C. Sampdoria and the Colombia national team.

Club career

Early years and Granada
Born in Cali, Murillo signed with Udinese Calcio in Italy shortly after his 18th birthday, being immediately loaned to Granada CF as part of the partnership agreement between both clubs. He spent his first year in Spain with the reserves, in the regional leagues.

In early February 2012, Murillo was definitely bought by the Andalusians, but spent the following seasons on loan to clubs also in the country, Cádiz CF and UD Las Palmas. He scored four official goals in his first year as a professional, including a brace on 9 March 2013 in a 3–2 away win against UD Almería in the Segunda División. He appeared in the promotion playoffs with both teams, being unsuccessful on both occasions.

Murillo returned to Granada in the middle of 2013, making his La Liga debut on 18 August 2013 in a 2–1 win at CA Osasuna (90 minutes played). He netted his first goal in the competition on 10 January of the following year, the first in a 4–0 home victory over Real Valladolid.

Inter Milan
In February 2015, Murillo joined Inter Milan on a five-year contract, with the transfer being made effective in July and costing a reported €8 million plus €2 million in bonuses, and earning the player €1 million per year. He made his Serie A debut on 23 August, playing the entire 1–0 home win against Atalanta BC.

Valencia
On 18 August 2017, Murillo returned to Spain by joining Valencia CF on a two-year loan with an obligation to buy. He contributed 17 matches in his first season, which ended in qualification to the group stage of the UEFA Champions League after a fourth-place finish.

On 20 December 2018, Murillo joined FC Barcelona on a loan deal until the end of the campaign with a purchase option worth €25 million. His first competitive appearance took place three weeks later, in a 1–2 away loss to Levante UD in the Copa del Rey's round of 16 where he played 90 minutes and was booked. He also started in the second leg, a 3–0 win at the Camp Nou.

Sampdoria
On 13 July 2019, still owned by Valencia, Murillo signed with U.C. Sampdoria for an initial loan fee of €2 million and an obligation to buy for €13 million at the end of the season. On 15 January 2020, the Italian club bought out his rights and loaned him to RC Celta de Vigo until 30 June, with an option to purchase.

Murillo agreed to another loan at the Balaídos on 16 September 2020. On 31 August of the following year, a similar move was arranged.

International career
Murillo made his debut for Colombia on 10 October 2014, playing 30 minutes in a 3–0 friendly win over El Salvador. He was included in the squad for the 2015 Copa América, scoring the only goal in the second group stage game against Brazil. During the quarter-final match against eventual finalists Argentina, he put on a strong performance in the 0–0 draw, but was one of three Colombian players to miss his penalty shootout attempt; he was subsequently named "Best Young Player" of the tournament.

Career statistics

Club

International

International goals
 (Colombia score listed first, score column indicates score after each Murillo goal)

Honours
Barcelona
La Liga: 2018–19

Valencia
Copa del Rey: 2018–19

Colombia U20
Toulon Tournament: 2011

Colombia
Copa América third place: 2016

Individual
Copa América Best Young Player / Team of the Tournament: 2015

References

External links

 
 
 

1992 births
Living people
Colombian people of African descent
Colombian footballers
Footballers from Cali
Association football defenders
Deportivo Cali footballers
Serie A players
Udinese Calcio players
Inter Milan players
U.C. Sampdoria players
La Liga players
Segunda División players
Segunda División B players
Divisiones Regionales de Fútbol players
Club Recreativo Granada players
Granada CF footballers
Cádiz CF players
UD Las Palmas players
Valencia CF players
FC Barcelona players
RC Celta de Vigo players
Colombia youth international footballers
Colombia under-20 international footballers
Colombia international footballers
2015 Copa América players
Copa América Centenario players
Colombian expatriate footballers
Expatriate footballers in Spain
Expatriate footballers in Italy
Colombian expatriate sportspeople in Spain
Colombian expatriate sportspeople in Italy